Kevin Nastiuk (born July 20, 1985) is a Ukrainian Canadian ice hockey goaltender, who most recently played for ACHW side Stony Plain Eagles.

Playing career
Nastiuk played junior hockey with the Medicine Hat Tigers from 2001 through 2005 and was drafted in the fourth round of the 2003 NHL Entry Draft by the Carolina Hurricanes. Nastiuk had played for several teams in the American Hockey League, ECHL and Central Hockey League before joining Eisbären Berlin in the later stages of the 2009–10 DEL season.

He stayed until  2012 and then signed with German second-division side Heilbronner Falken for the 2012-13 campaign. For the following season, he moved to fellow DEL2 club Dresdner Eislöwen, where he spent two years, before returning to Eisbären Berlin of the Deutsche Eishockey Liga in July 2015.

Nastiuk also played for Dresdner Eislöwen of the DEL2 in Germany, before moving to the UK to sign for EIHL side Coventry Blaze in June 2017.

Awards
2004 – WHL airBC Trophy
2005 – WHL East Second All-Star Team

References

External links

1985 births
Living people
Alaska Aces (ECHL) players
Albany River Rats players
Canadian ice hockey goaltenders
Canadian people of Ukrainian descent
Carolina Hurricanes draft picks
Corpus Christi Icerays players
Coventry Blaze players
Dresdner Eislöwen players
Eisbären Berlin players
Florida Everblades players
Gwinnett Gladiators players
Heilbronner Falken players
Idaho Steelheads (ECHL) players
Las Vegas Wranglers players
Lowell Lock Monsters players
Medicine Hat Tigers players
Providence Bruins players
Ice hockey people from Edmonton
Canadian expatriate ice hockey players in England
Canadian expatriate ice hockey players in Germany